Kidnapped to Mystery Island (Italian: I misteri della giungla nera, German: Das Geheimnis der Lederschlinge and 'The Snake Hunter Strangler') is a 1964 Italian-German adventure film directed by Luigi Capuano and starring Guy Madison, Ingeborg Schöner and Ivan Desny. In West Germany it was released by Bavaria Film and in the United States by its parent company Columbia Pictures. It was based on a novel by the popular Italian writer Emilio Salgari.

Synopsis
In British India, the small daughter of a British officer is captured by a cult.

Cast
Guy Madison as Souyadhana
Ingeborg Schöner as Ada
Giacomo Rossi-Stuart as Tremal Naik
Ivan Desny	as Maciadi
Giulia Rubini as Gundali
Ferdinando Poggi as Kammamuri
Peter van Eyck as Captain McPherson
Aldo Bufi Landi as Sergeant Baratha
Romano Giomini as Windy
Aldo Cristiani

References

Bibliography 
 James Robert Parish. Film Actors Guide. Scarecrow Press, 1977.

External links
 

1964 films
West German films
1960s Italian-language films
1960s historical adventure films
Films directed by Luigi Capuano
Films based on the Indo-Malaysian cycle
Films scored by Carlo Rustichelli
Films set in the British Raj
Columbia Pictures films
Bavaria Film films
Italian historical adventure films
German historical adventure films
1960s Italian films
1960s German films
Italian-language German films